The Word Bookstore, or simply The Word, is an independent bookstore in Montreal, Quebec, Canada, located in the McGill Ghetto downtown. It specializes in used philosophy and English poetry books.

History
The bookstore was started by Adrian King-Edwards and Luci Friesen of McGill University in 1973 in their own apartment living room as an "underground" bookstore, with a photo of George Bernard Shaw in their front window. The couple, who had first met at McGill University, had spent the previous summer hawking paperbacks out of their Volkswagen van in northern British Columbia, prior to the opening of the store in their apartment. They moved their store next door to its current location on 469 Milton Street in 1975, a 19th-century brick building which was the site of the former neighbourhood Chinese laundry for 70 years. 

The Word has frequently ranked as the number one secondhand bookstore in the Montreal Mirror’s annual Best of Montreal list. In 2009, the Quebec Writers’ Federation presented Friesen and King-Edwards with the QWF community award in honour of the couple’s contribution to local literary culture. The Word holds readings of poetic works and publication announcement of local authors and has been cited as an inspiration to Artie Gold and Sheila Fischman.

Specialization
The Word Bookstore specializes in literature, philosophy and poetry. They also carry an assortment of books in such fields as drama, history, political science, theology, Eastern religion, and art. A section located at the front of the store beneath a photo of Leonard Cohen highlights the latest work of Montreal poets. It is a member of the Antiquarian Booksellers Association of Canada.

References

External links
The Word Bookstore - Montreal

Independent bookstores of Canada
Quebec Anglophone culture in Montreal
Antiquarian booksellers
Le Plateau-Mont-Royal
Shops in Montreal
Retail companies established in 1973
1973 establishments in Quebec